Senonches is a commune in Eure-et-Loir, Centre-Val de Loire, France.

Geography
Senonches is located northwest of the department of Eure-et-Loir and the northeastern boundary of the Regional Natural Park of the  Perche, at a crossroads between the towns of Verneuil-sur-Avre (22 km), Mortagne-au-Perche (41 km), Nogent-le-Rotrou (33 km), Chartres (37 km) and Dreux (38 km).
With 4,287 hectares, the forest of Senonches is the largest department, and one of the largest woods in France. It is much rich in plant species and shrubs. The country is also known for its springs and groundwater (in the forest) that supply a portion of the water distributed in Paris and is captured in Rueil-la-Gadelière.

Tourism

Senonches is surrounded by a vast forest (the largest in the department), formed mainly by  oaks and beech, these remarkable trees can be  explored on foot or by bike, including the "oak chair" and the "three brothers."
The castle under renovation since 2003, will be reopened in Spring of 2012. Its tower dungeon made of a ferruginous stone, typical of the region, is very curious for most visitors.

Others

There is a market every Friday in the city center with many marketers. The Senonches Dreux airport, a NATO base, where  fighters and bombers can take off (this base was turned into  a photovoltaic solar plant  in 2012).

Population

See also
Natural region of Thymerais
Communes of the Eure-et-Loir department
 Perche

References

Communes of Eure-et-Loir
Perche